General elections were held in San Marino on 27 February 1949. The result was a victory for the Committee of Freedom, which won 35 of the 60 seats in the Grand and General Council.

Electoral system
Voters had to be citizens of San Marino, male and at least 24 years old.

Results

References

San Marino
General elections in San Marino
General
San Marino